Farm Island Recreation Area is a state recreation area in Hughes County, South Dakota in the United States. It is named for Farm Island located in the Missouri River, just downstream of Pierre, the state capitol. The island is now connected to the main shore via a causeway. The area is popular for camping, hiking, fishing, boating, and other water-based recreational opportunities.

See also
List of South Dakota state parks

References

External links
 Farm Island Recreation Area - South Dakota Department of Game, Fish, and Parks

Protected areas of Hughes County, South Dakota
Protected areas of South Dakota
State parks of South Dakota